Skeletons is the third studio album by American country music duo Brothers Osborne. It was released by EMI Records Nashville on October 9, 2020. The album includes the singles "All Night" and "I'm Not for Everyone".

Content
"All Night" was released to radio in 2020 as the album's lead single.

The album was re-released on January 21, 2022 with the bonus tracks "Younger Me",  "Headstone", and "Midnight Rider's Prayer". "Younger Me" was released in mid-2021 as a promotional single in honor of lead singer T. J. Osborne coming out as gay earlier in the year. The track "Midnight Rider's Prayer" incorporates Willie Nelson's "On the Road Again" and thus credits Nelson as a co-writer.

Critical reception
Stephen Thomas Erlewine of AllMusic rated the album 4.5 out of 5 stars, stating that "Maybe it's true that Brothers Osborne aren't quite for everyone, an admission they shrug off early on the album, but the great thing about Skeletons is how it sounds like they're appealing to wide quadrants of rock, pop, country, and Americana audiences without sounding like anything but themselves."

Awards and nominations

Skeletons was nominated for the Album of the Year award at the 55th Annual Country Music Association Awards and "Younger Me" was nominated for Video of the Year. Brothers Osborne won the Vocal Duo of the Year award based on the strength of the album. It was also nominated for the Album of the Year award at the 56th Academy of Country Music Awards.

Brothers Osborne received two nominations at the 64th Grammy Awards: Grammy Award for Best Country Album for Skeletons and Best Country Duo/Group Performance for "Younger Me."  The latter won a Grammy.

Track listing
Courtesy of AllMusic and Rolling Stone Country.

Personnel
Adapted from liner notes.

Brothers Osborne
John Osborne – acoustic guitar, electric guitar, background vocals, second lead vocal on "I'm Not for Everyone"
T.J. Osborne – lead vocals, acoustic guitar, 12-string acoustic guitar

Additional musicians
Adam Box – drums, handclapping, percussion, background vocals
Jason Graumlich – electric guitar, handclapping, background vocals
Jason Hall – handclapping, background vocals
Jaxon Hargrove – background vocals
Jay Joyce – 5-string banjo, acoustic guitar, keyboards, percussion, programming, synthesizer, background vocals
Billy Justineau – accordion, 5-string banjo, handclapping, Hammond B-3 organ, keyboards, piano, Wurlitzer electric piano, background vocals
Gideon Klein – fiddle
Jimmy Mansfield – handclapping, background vocals
John Peets – handclapping
Lucie Silvas – background vocals
Pete Sternberg – bass guitar, handclapping, background vocals

Charts

Weekly charts

Year-end charts

References 

2020 albums
Brothers Osborne albums
EMI Records albums
Albums produced by Jay Joyce